Kanayi ("The land of God") is a village in Kannur district, Kerala, in South India. It is at a distance of 12 km from Payyannur. Vannathi Puzha and Meenkuzhi Dam are very important for its agriculture and fishing. Unni Kanayi is now a well known artist.

Transportation
The national highway passes through Perumba junction. Goa and Mumbai can be accessed on the northern side and Cochin and Thiruvananthapuram can be accessed on the southern side. The road to the east of Iritty connects to Mysore and Bangalore. The nearest railway station is Payyanur on Mangalore-Palakkad line.

Trains are available to almost all parts of India subject to advance booking over the internet. There are airports at Kannur, Mangalore and Calicut. All of them are international airports but direct flights are available only to Middle Eastern countries.

Plants of Kanayi
Rijuraj M P et al (2017) reported a new endemic plant Rotala kanayensis from the marshy substratum of a drying depression on the lateritic rock surface.''''

References

Villages near Payyanur